Hervé Delamarre (born 16 November 1967, in Bernay) is a French slalom canoeist.

Career
Delamarre competed from the early 1990s to the early 2000s. He won two silver medals at the ICF Canoe Slalom World Championships (C1: 1993, C1 team: 1991).

Delamarre also finished fifth in the C1 event at the 1996 Summer Olympics in Atlanta.

World Cup individual podiums

References

1967 births
Canoeists at the 1996 Summer Olympics
French male canoeists
Living people
Olympic canoeists of France
Medalists at the ICF Canoe Slalom World Championships